Films produced in Norway in the 2000s:

References

External links
 Norwegian film at the Internet Movie Database

2000s
Norwegian
Films